Halakabad (also Romanized as Halākābād) is a village in Beyhaq Rural District, Sheshtomad District, Sabzevar County, Razavi Khorasan Province, Iran. At the 2006 census, its population was 133, in 46 families.

References 

Populated places in Sabzevar County